Aikton is a civil parish in the Borough of Allerdale in Cumbria, England.  It contains eight buildings that are recorded in the National Heritage List for England as designated listed buildings.  Of these, one is listed at Grade I, the highest of the three grades, and the others are at Grade II, the lowest grade.  The parish contains the village of Aikton and is otherwise almost completely rural.  Apart from a church, the listed buildings are houses and associated structures, or farmhouses and farm buildings.


Key

Buildings

References

Citations

Sources

Lists of listed buildings in Cumbria